The Red Guardian (Russian: Красный страж, Krasnyy Strazh) is the name of several fictional characters (superheroes and supervillains) appearing in American comic books published by Marvel Comics: Aleksey Lebedev, Alexei Shostakov, Tania Belinsky, Josef Petkus, Krassno Granitsky, Anton Ivanov, and Nikolai Krylenko, as well as a villainous Life Model Decoy of Aleksei Shostakov. The Red Guardian is an identity that was created as the Soviet equivalent of Captain America, although its use has continued after the dissolution of the Soviet Union. In the continuity of Ultimate Marvel, the Red Guardian is adapted as two separate characters: Captain Russia and Colonel Abdul al-Rahma.

Several iterations of the Red Guardian have made scattered appearances in animated media and video games, with Anton Ivanov / The Superior and Alexei Shostakov appearing in live-action media set in the Marvel Cinematic Universe (MCU): Zach McGowan portraying Ivanov (also adapting MODOK) in the fourth and fifth seasons of the television series Agents of S.H.I.E.L.D. (2016–2018) in a recurring role, and David Harbour portraying Shostakov in the film Black Widow (2021), and set to reprise the role in the upcoming film Thunderbolts (2024), as well as voice an alternate version of the character in the Disney+ animated series Marvel Zombies.

Fictional character biography

Aleksey Lebedev
Aleksey Lebedev (Russian: Алексей Лебедев), the Golden Age version of the Red Guardian, first appeared in Namor, The Sub-Mariner Annual #1 (June 1991), created by writers Dana Moreshead and Mike Thomas, and artist Phil Hester. Very little is known of him, but he fought alongside Captain America (William Naslund) and the Sub-Mariner at the Potsdam Conference, in July 1945. He began his career during World War II, and met the All-Winners Squad (formerly the Invaders) on only one recorded occasion, clashing with them shortly after the war's end where he taunted Captain America (secretly the Patriot) that he was 'slowing down' after he was able to catch Captain America's shield. Like the other crusaders of the same name, he was created as a Soviet counterpart to Captain America. He was later apparently killed during the purges of the 1950s, opposing the brutal experiments that would later create his successor.

Alexei Shostakov
Alexei Andreevich Shostakov was the first version of the Red Guardian, and was created by Roy Thomas and John Buscema, first appearing in Avengers #43 (January 1967).

Alexei Shostakov was born in Moscow, and was the husband of Natasha Romanova. Both he and his wife were agents of the Soviets: the latter as the Black Widow while the former became a test pilot and KGB agent and then trained as a Soviet counterpart to Captain America known as the "Red Guardian".

Alexei Shostakov was one of the Soviet Union's most acclaimed pilots. During World War II on the Eastern Front, he shot down a large number of Luftwaffe fighter planes in aerial battles and was credited for helping the Soviet Air Forces win air supremacy over the skies of Stalingrad and Kursk. Because of his extraordinary skill, Shostakov was chosen for the most secret and dangerous tests and new aircraft for the Soviet Union. This included being the first pilot to test fly the MiG-15. The Soviet state controlled news media greatly publicized this and certain other missions of his such as his aerial battles against the U.S. Air Force over MiG Alley during the Korean War. As a result, Shostakov was decorated as a hero of the Soviet Union. Shostakov was also successful in his private life, having married the equally famous ballerina Natalia (familiarly known as Natasha) Romanova.

As the Cold War flared up in the 1950s, Soviet Premier Nikita Khrushchev realized that the Soviet Union needed its own equivalent to Captain America. Khrushchev chose Alexei Shostakov over Yuri Gagarin who would later become the first man in space. The KGB faked his death and trained him in secret, keeping his survival a secret from Natasha. He became a master of hand-to-hand combat and a highly skilled athlete. In addition, he carried a throwing disc on his belt which could be used against an opponent. Magnetic force returned the disc after throwing. The disc had the yellow hammer and sickle symbol on it and his costume was red with a star on his chest to symbolise the Soviet flag. While the Black Widow became disillusioned with KGB masters and defected to the United States, the Red Guardian remained loyal and became more ruthless and vindictive. The Red Guardian battled the Avengers with his Chinese ally Colonel Ling, to protect a Communist Chinese secret weapon located at a secret military base at an unrevealed location in the People's Republic of China, encountering the Black Widow and Captain America (Steve Rogers). When the Black Widow noticed "something familiar" about him,v revealed his identity. He was shot and mortally wounded minutes later by Colonel Ling while saving the lives of the Black Widow and Captain America. He was buried under molten lava when a laser blast caused the eruption of a long-dormant volcano.

Alexei Shostakov L.M.D.
Some time later, a Life Model Decoy (LMD) patterned after the Alexei Shostakov was introduced in the "Widow Maker" crossover between the Hawkeye & Mockingbird and Black Widow titles as Ronin, by Jim McCann & Duane Swierczynski and David Lopez & Manuel Garcia. The LMD initially started assassinating spies and eventually targeted Mockingbird and the Black Widow. After he was seemingly destroyed in his first battle with the Black Widow, the LMD was later revealed to be alive and had risen very high up in power within Bulgaria as Ronin. The LMD was responsible for a plot to capture and try his "former wife" for crimes as a Soviet super soldier, but his plan was foiled with the help of Daredevil and the Avengers.

Dr. Tania Belinsky

Dr. Tania Belinsky, a neurosurgeon from the USSR, later adopted the Red Guardian identity and joined the Defenders. Created by Steve Gerber and Sal Buscema, she first appeared in The Defenders #35 (May 1976).

Josef Petkus
Josef Petkus is the fourth version of the Red Guardian, first appearing in Captain America #352 (April 1989), and was created by writer Mark Gruenwald and artist Kieron Dwyer. The character subsequently appears in The Avengers #319–324 (July–October 1990), The Incredible Hulk (vol. 2) #393 (May 1992), and Soviet Super-Soldiers #1 (November 1992). The character subsequently appears as the Steel Guardian in Iron Man (vol. 2) #9 (October 1998). Petkus appeared as part of the "Supreme Soviets" entry in the Official Handbook of the Marvel Universe Update '89 #7.

Josef Petkus was a special operative for the intelligence agencies of the Soviet Union, and appeared as a member of the militant Supreme Soviets. Alongside the Supreme Soviets, he attacked the Soviet Super-Soldiers for defecting from the Soviet Union. Alongside Captain America, he later battled a bear-like creature composed of the Darkforce. The Supreme Soviets were later renamed the post-Soviet Russian super-team called the Winter Guard. Alongside this confederacy, he teamed with the Avengers and Alpha Flight to battle the Peace Corpse, the Atlantean Army, and the Combine. Petkus later joined a Winter Guard splinter group called the People's Protectorate, now calling himself the "Steel Guardian". He and his team went off in search of the timelord Immortus, hoping to find a way to resurrect Vanguard's sister Lanyia. They agreed to fight off Dire Wraiths invading Immortus' realm in exchange for this favor; Josef being killed while in the line of duty.

Krassno Granitsky
Krassno Granitsky, a fifth version of the Red Guardian, appeared in Maverick #10 (June 1998), and was created by writer Jorge Gonzales and artist Leo Fernandez. The name "Krassno Granitsky" comes from the James Bond novel From Russia With Love; it is the Russianized name of the assassin Donovan "Red" Grant. He teamed up with the mercenary superhero Maverick to battle a crime lord. He also appeared in the first issue of Ed Brubaker's Captain America, where he was executed by Aleksander Lukin.

Anton Ivanov
Anton Ivanov, the sixth version of the Red Guardian, made his first appearance in the first issue of Jeph Loeb's Hulk series (co-created with Ed McGuinness) as a member of the Winter Guard. Anton claims to be an engineer and a former pilot of the Crimson Dynamo armor, and was later revealed to be (at least partially) a Life Model Decoy (LMD). He was decapitated by a Dire Wraith, although his head was kept in storage, seemingly still alive, and in control of other LMDs.

Nikolai Krylenko

Nikolai Krylenko (also known as Vanguard) is the seventh version of the Red Guardian, and leads the Winter Guard. Created by Bill Mantlo and Carmine Infantino for Iron Man #109 (April 1978), he was redeveloped as the Red Guardian by David Gallaher and Steve Ellis from Darkstar and the Winter Guard #2 (July 2010) onward.

Powers and abilities
None of the Red Guardian's various identity users have been revealed to possess superhuman powers or abilities, with the exception of Tania Belinsky after her mutation by the Presence, Ultimate Marvel versions, Krylenko, the seventh Red Guardian, and adaptations of the character to the Marvel Cinematic Universe (MCU). All are highly skilled athletes. Shostakov was an expert pilot, a master hand-to-hand combatant, and was trained in espionage techniques by the KGB. All of the Guardians but Alexei and Tania have used a steel shield similar to that used by Captain America. Alexei and Tania used a "belt-buckle" disc, a hurling weapon which magnetically returned to the wearer's hand when thrown, and was a part of their costume's belt buckle. The fourth Red Guardian, Josef Petkus, often employed an energized sword as a secondary weapon alongside his shield. The sixth Red Guardian was an LMD named Anton Ivanov, whose powers are cybernetic based. His falsified backstory was that he was an expert engineer and former Crimson Dynamo pilot; his real strength lies in his moderate degree of enhanced cybernetic physicality. The latest Red Guardian is Nikolai Krylenko/Vanguard, brother to Laynia Petrovna, whose powers are derived from his mutation. which stems to a fullbody force field that repels electromagnetic and kinetic energy, forces he can best guide and direct through a medium like the technically advanced vibranium shield supplied to him by the Executive Security Committee. or through a crux like the former symbol of his home country, a hammer and sickle. He also directs this force against the earth itself to obtain flight. Nikolai wears a more advanced suit than previous Red Guardians, which is lined with circuitry that works in conjunction with the compact computer on his shield, not only enabling the guided flight and return through their digital connection, but the amplification of the effects of his own energy field.

Other versions

Exiles
In one of the Exiles realities, a Red Guardian in full body armor on Earth-3470 appears.

Civil War: House of M
In Civil War: House of M, the Red Guardian was seen as a member of the Soviet Super Soldiers.

Ultimate Marvel

Captain Russia
The Ultimate Marvel version of Alexei Shostakov is a Russian super soldier codenamed "Captain Russia". Meant to be the Russian counterpart of Captain America, this version is certifiably insane and uses a makeshift shield created partially from human remains, and possesses superhuman strength and durability. A fight between the two results in Captain America defeating him, by stabbing him with splintered wood that acts as a stake through the chest, declaring "Fighting is about winning." Shostakov was once married to Black Widow and is now deceased.

Colonel Abdul al-Rahma

Colonel Abdul al-Rahman from Azerbaijan (leader of the Liberators) was also based on the Red Guardian. As the character was a parallel to Captain America, he wears a predominantly red costume and was transformed into a super-soldier by Russian scientists as well as uses a weapon which resembles a double bladed lightsaber. He faces off against Steve Rogers in front of the White House, one on one but is defeated when the Hulk throws the shield to sever his hands and Rogers kills him with his own weapon. Shocked at learning Adbul was a teenager, who wanted to free his country from American occupation, Rogers looks on as his body is later taken into S.H.I.E.L.D. custody.

Bullet Points
In the Bullet Points reality, Alexei Shostakov was shown as many of the heroes stopping Galactus.

In other media

Television
 The Alexei Shostakov incarnation of the Red Guardian appears in the Avengers Assemble episode "Secret Avengers", voiced by Troy Baker. This version is a member of the Winter Guard.
 The Nikolai Krylenko incarnation of the Red Guardian appears in Marvel Future Avengers, voiced by Satoshi Mikami in Japanese and Fred Tatasciore in English. This version is a member of the Winter Guard.

Marvel Cinematic Universe

Different adaptations of incarnations of the Red Guardian appear in media set in the Marvel Cinematic Universe (MCU):
 The Anton Ivanov incarnation of the Red Guardian appears in the fourth and fifth seasons of the live-action television series Agents of S.H.I.E.L.D. (2016–2018), portrayed by Zach McGowan. This version is a reclusive Russian industrialist known as "The Superior", who believes Inhumans to be monsters, working with the Watchdogs, Senator Nadeer, and Holden Radcliffe to fight S.H.I.E.L.D.; after being crippled by Daisy Johnson, Ivanov is decapitated by Aida and kept alive as a brain in a vat, given a series of Life-Model Decoys Designed Only for Killing (L-MODOKs) for his mind to remotely control. After finding Ivanov's head, Hydra General Hale persuades to join up with her, assisting him in confront Inhuman S.H.I.E.L.D. agent Elena "Yo-Yo" Rodriguez before the LMD containing his brain is knocked out of a window, deactivating the rest of his LMDs and leaving his fate uncertain. Ivanov was introduced in the fourth season by showrunners Jed Whedon, Maurissa Tancharoen, and Jeffrey Bell with the intent of being transformed into MODOK in the series' fifth season, before Marvel Studios retracted their previously granted access to the character to be known by the name, with the mantle instead being assumed by Ernest Vigman in the pilot for New Warriors (2018) and Darren Cross in the film Ant-Man and the Wasp: Quantumania (2023).
 The Alexei Shostakov incarnation of the Red Guardian appears in the live-action films Black Widow (2021) and Thunderbolts (2024) and the animated series Marvel Zombies, portrayed by David Harbour. This version is the Russian super-soldier counterpart to Captain America and a father-figure to Natasha Romanoff and Yelena Belova. Harbour said Shostakov has "tons of cracks all over him. And he's not the heroic, noble man that [people] want him to be. He both comically and tragically has a lot of flaws". For Harbour's portrayal, he and Black Widow director Cate Shortland discussed Ricky Gervais' performance in The Office and Philip Seymour Hoffman's in The Savages (2007), "comedy that comes out of real domestic need".
 In Black Widow (2021), years prior to the film's main events, Shostakov allies himself with General Dreykov of the Red Room, who sends him on a mission to the United States alongside Melina Vostokoff, Romanoff, and Belova, respectively his surrogate wife and daughters. After concluding the mission however, Dreykov has Shostakov incarcerated in the Seventh Circle Prison. In the present, Romanoff and Belova free Shostakov to help them and Vostokoff destroy the Red Room.
 An alternate timeline version of Shostakov will appear in the upcoming animated series Marvel Zombies.
 Harbour will reprise his role as Shostakov in the upcoming live-action film Thunderbolts (2024), depicted as a member of the titular team alongside Belova.

Video games
 The Alexei Shostakov incarnation of the Red Guardian appears in Lego Marvel Super Heroes 2.
 The MCU version of Alexei Shostakov / Red Guardian appears as a playable character in Marvel: Future Fight as part of the Black Widow film tie-in update.
 The MCU version of Alexei Shostakov / Red Guardian appears as a playable character in Marvel Puzzle Quest.
 The MCU version of Alexei Shostakov / Red Guardian appears as a playable character in Marvel Strike Force.

References

External links
 Red Guardian (Alexei Shostakov) at Marvel.com
 

Characters created by Jeph Loeb
Characters created by John Buscema
Characters created by Mark Gruenwald
Characters created by Roy Thomas
Comics characters introduced in 1967
Comics characters introduced in 1989
Fictional aviators
Fictional blade and dart throwers
Fictional KGB agents
Fictional Russian people
Fictional shield fighters
Fictional Soviet people
Marvel Comics cyborgs
Marvel Comics martial artists
Marvel Comics robots
Marvel Comics superheroes
Russian superheroes
Soviet Union-themed superheroes